Zoilus II Soter (epithet means "the Saviour")  was an Indo-Greek king who ruled in eastern Punjab. Bopearachchi dates his reign to c. 55–35 BC, a date approximately supported by R. C. Senior. It is possible that some of his coins were issued by a separate king, Zoilus III.

Rule

Zoilus seems to have been one of the rulers who succeeded the last important Indo-Greek king Apollodotus II in the eastern parts of his former kingdom. All these kings use the same symbol as Apollodotus II, the fighting Pallas Athene introduced by Menander I, and usually also the same epithet  Soter (Saviour). It is therefore possible that they belonged to the same dynasty, and Zoilus II could also have been related to the earlier king Zoilus I, but the lack of written sources make all such conjections uncertain.

He may have been the Bactrian ally of Mark Antony and Cleopatra VII referred to by Virgil in his vision of the Battle of Actium in :

Coinage
Zoilus II issued silver drachms with diademed portrait and Pallas Athene in rather crude style, and two sorts of bronzes in various denominations: "Apollo, with tripod and small elephant", and "Elephant and tripod".

Zoilus III, a separate king?

The portraits attributed to Zoilus II could be divided into two groups; one depicting a balding man with hollow cheeks, the other a seemingly younger man with a fringe and round cheeks. As numismatic evidence indicates that the younger portraits are later, recent research has suggested that they be attributed to a younger king, Zoilus III Soter, who would then have been a son and successor of the older Zoilos. 

In particular, the mint mark which is characteristic of the coins of Zoilos with a full head of hair, is a later mint mark used down to the last Indo-Greek kings Strato II and Strato III, suggesting a later reign for Zoilus III. This mint-mark however was never used by the "balding" Zoilus II, or by any king before him.

Indo-Scythian imitations
The Indo-Scythian king Bhadayasa also copied coins of Zoilus II, or the hypothetical Zoilus III, only mentioning his own name on the Kharoshthi legend of his coins.

Monograms
Many of the monograms on the coins of Zoilus II are in Kharoshti, indicating that they were probably made by an Indian moneyer. This is a characteristic of several of the Indo-Greek kings of the eastern Punjab, such as Strato I, Apollodotus II, and sometimes Apollophanes and Dionysios. Furthermore, the monogram is often identical on their coins, indicating that the moneyer, or the place of mint, were the same.

The coins of Zoilus II combine Greek monograms with Kharoshthi ones, indicating that some of the celators may have been native Indians. The Kharoshthi monograms are the letters for: sti, ji, ra, ga, gri, ha, stri, ri, bu, a, di, stra, and śi. The "Apollo and tripod" and "Elephant and tripod" types only have Kharoshthi monograms, while the portrait types usually have combinations of Greek and Kharoshthi monograms. The monogram 62 (below) has been shown to be the last Indo-Greek monogram, and only appears on the younger portraits that may belong to Zoilus III.

Findspots

The coins of Zoilus II have been found in the Sutlej and Sialkot II hoards, and in Punjab hoards east in the Jhelum (Bopearachchi, p138).

Also, 25 coins of Zoilus II were found under the foundations of a 1st-century BC rectangular chapel in the monastery of Dharmarajika, near Taxila.

Two coins of Zoilus II were also found in the Bara hoard near Peshawar, together with coins of the Indo-Scythian kings Azes I, Azilises, Azes II.

Overstrikes
A coin of Zoilus II was overstruck on a coin of Apollodotus II.

See also
 Greco-Bactrian Kingdom
 Seleucid Empire
 Greco-Buddhism
 Indo-Scythians
 Indo-Parthian Kingdom
 Kushan Empire

Notes

References
 The Greeks in Bactria and India, W. W. Tarn, Cambridge University Press.
 Indo-Greek Coins, R. B. Whitehead, 1914.

Indo-Greek kings
1st-century BC rulers in Asia
Greek Buddhist monarchs